KXEN (1010 kHz) is a commercial AM radio station licensed to St. Louis, Missouri, United States.  The station is owned by BDJ Radio Enterprises, LLC.

KXEN's studios and offices are on Hampton Avenue in St. Louis.  Its transmitter is located near the Interstate 255/Illinois Route 255/Interstate 270 intersection in Pontoon Beach, Illinois.

It used to carry a religious radio format, with most of the hours sold to national and local Christian radio hosts.

KXEN broadcasts in the daytime at 160 watts.  Because AM 1010 is a Canadian clear-channel frequency reserved for Class A stations CFRB Toronto and CBR Calgary, Alberta, KXEN must reduce power at night to 14 watts to avoid interference.  KXEN uses a non-directional antenna at all times.  Programming is simulcast on FM translator K283CI 104.5 MHz.

History
KXEN is considered a "move-in" station, originally licensed to Festus, Missouri, about 25 miles south of St. Louis.  On May 10, 1951, the station first signed on the air.  Its call letters were KJCF, a daytimer powered at only 250 watts, owned by Jefferson County Radio and TV, Inc.

In 1959, the station was acquired by Garrett Broadcasting.  The call letters were changed to KXEN and the studios and offices moved to the Congress Hotel in St. Louis, broadcasting a mix of Southern Gospel music and preaching programs.  The signal was boosted to 50,000 watts to target the Greater St. Louis radio market.  But the station still had to sign-off at sunset to avoid interfering with the Class A Canadian stations.  (Another station, now KJFF, signed on in Festus at AM 1400, supplying local programming for that community, using the KJCF call letters.)

In the 1970s, the station official changed to a "hyphenated" city of license, Festus-St. Louis, for its legal identification.  In the early 1990s, KXEN got authorization for nighttime operation, at 500 watts.

In July 2002, PDJ Radio Enterprises acquired KXEN, continuing the religious format.  A short time later, the city of license was changed again, this time to only St. Louis, no longer needing to mention Festus in the legal identification.

On October 27, 2021, KXEN started simulcasting KRTK to improve coverage in the St. Louis City area.

With the expansion of "Real Talk" to other frequencies, in November 2021, the group of stations were called "The Real Talk Radio Network."

References

External links

FCC History Cards for KXEN

Conservative talk radio
Radio stations established in 1971
XEN